Acrobasis kylesi is a species of snout moth in the genus Acrobasis. It was described by Herbert H. Neunzig in 1986 and is known from Louisiana, United States.

The larvae feed on Ostrya virginiana.

References

Moths described in 1986
Acrobasis
Moths of North America